Current Swell is a Canadian indie rock band from Victoria, British Columbia, Canada. The band has released seven albums; So I Say, Trust Us Now, Protect Your Own, Long Time Ago, Ulysses, When to Talk and When to Listen and Buffalo.

History
Current Swell's roots lie on the west coast of Canada in Victoria, British Columbia, on Vancouver Island. The band's members are Scott Stanton, Dave Lang, Louis Sadava and Chris Petersen. Originally a group of friends hanging out, jamming, and writing music, the band began performing in backyards and on beaches, and has gained popularity through its online presence and dedicated Internet fan base. The band has been noted for its authenticity and for remaining true to its upbeat folk roots.

Current Swell sold out the very first show they played as a band. They had released a short, five-song EP on the internet that was discovered by northern Vancouver Island high school students. The band had booked a show at a local coffee shop in hopes of playing in front of a few people but ended up playing in front of a packed audience.

The band credits much of their success to their fans, particularly the online community. Their song Young and Able (2009) became an Internet hit through its popularization on YouTube. The Internet has contributed significantly to the Canadian west coast band's large following in South America, particularly Brazil, where it headlined in Rio de Janeiro and São Paulo in 2012.

Current Swell has opened for bands like The Beach Boys, Xavier Rudd, Dispatch, Bedouin Soundclash and The Beautiful Girls, and has made appearances at the 2010 Winter Olympics and the Ottawa Bluesfest.

In 2011, Current Swell placed first at Vancouver's Peak Performance Project, winning the $100,500 top prize. The band also played one of the largest concerts of its kind in Victoria at a Canada Day concert for 45,000 people at the B.C. Legislature.

The band's sound combines the musical styles of folk, rock, roots, blues, reggae, and ska; it has also been described as "surf rock."

In 2014, it was announced that the band would be releasing their fourth studio album on May 6, entitled Ulysses. The album was produced by Nathan Sabatino (Dr. Dog, White Rabbits) at Vancouver's Greenhouse Studios. The first single was the third track on the album, called Rollin'''.  Rollin' is also featured in the Teton Gravity Research-Anthill Films 2015 film unReal.

Influences
The band's albums So I Say, Trust Us Now, and Protect Your Own were inspired predominantly by their experiences traveling. However, the people in the band's life--friends, strangers, and fans who have been a part of their journey and development as artists, influenced the album Long Time Ago.

 Discography 

 Studio albums So I Say (2005)Trust Us Now (2007)Protect Your Own (2009)Long Time Ago (2011)Ulysses (2014)When to Talk and When to Listen (2017)Buffalo (2019)

 Extended plays At Home (2004)

 Compilation appearances Vancouver 125 (2011) Song: "Granville Town"Paste Holiday Sampler (2012) Song: "Christmas Alone"Isn't This World Enough - A Nettwerk Christmas'' (2012) Song: "Christmas Alone"

Personnel
Scott Stanton – Vocals/lead guitar/slide guitar
Dave Lang – Vocals/guitar/harmonica
Louis Sadava – Bass/Vocals
Marcus Manhas - Drums
Phil Hamelin - Keys/Trumpet
Dave St. Jean - Trombone

Extended Family
Evan Miller - Guitar Vocals
Marty Parr - Tour Manager Extraordinaire
Morgan Brooker - Management
Stephen Franke - Management

Previous Members
Chris Petersen – Drums/Vocals
Mike Quirke - Drums
Ghosty Boy - Bass

References

Canadian indie rock groups
Musical groups from Victoria, British Columbia
Canadian indie folk groups
Canadian folk rock groups
Musical quartets
Musical groups established in 2005
2005 establishments in British Columbia
Nettwerk Music Group artists